Eupithecia jeanneli is a moth in the  family Geometridae. It is found in Equatorial Guinea, Kenya and Uganda.

References

Moths described in 1953
jeanneli
Moths of Africa